In computability theory, computational complexity theory and proof theory, a fast-growing hierarchy (also called an extended Grzegorczyk hierarchy) is an ordinal-indexed family of rapidly increasing functions fα: N → N (where N is the set of natural numbers {0, 1, ...}, and α ranges up to some large countable ordinal). A primary example is the Wainer hierarchy, or Löb–Wainer hierarchy, which is an extension to all α < ε0.  Such hierarchies provide a natural way to classify computable functions according to rate-of-growth and computational complexity.

Definition
Let μ be a large countable ordinal such that to every limit ordinal α < μ there is assigned a fundamental sequence (a strictly increasing sequence of ordinals whose supremum is α).  A fast-growing hierarchy of functions fα: N → N, for α < μ, is then defined as follows:

 if α is a limit ordinal.

Here fαn(n) =  fα(fα(...(fα(n))...)) denotes the nth iterate of  fα applied to n, and α[n] denotes the nth element of the fundamental sequence assigned to the limit ordinal α.  (An alternative definition takes the number of iterations to be n+1, rather than n, in the second line above.)

The initial part of this hierarchy, comprising the functions fα with finite index (i.e., α < ω), is often called the Grzegorczyk hierarchy because of its close relationship to the Grzegorczyk hierarchy; note, however, that the former is here an indexed family of functions fn, whereas the latter is an indexed family of sets of functions . (See Points of Interest below.)

Generalizing the above definition even further, a fast iteration hierarchy is obtained by taking f0 to be any non-decreasing function g: N → N.

For limit ordinals not greater than ε0, there is a straightforward natural definition of the fundamental sequences (see the Wainer hierarchy below), but beyond ε0 the definition is much more complicated.  However, this is possible well beyond the Feferman–Schütte ordinal, Γ0, up to at least the Bachmann–Howard ordinal. Using Buchholz psi functions one can extend this definition easily to the ordinal of transfinitely iterated -comprehension (see Analytical hierarchy).

A fully specified extension beyond the recursive ordinals is thought to be unlikely; e.g., Prӧmel et al. [1991](p. 348) note that in such an attempt "there would even arise problems in ordinal notation".

The Wainer hierarchy

The Wainer hierarchy is the particular fast-growing hierarchy of functions fα (α ≤ ε0) obtained by defining the fundamental sequences as follows [Gallier 1991][Prӧmel, et al., 1991]:

For limit ordinals λ < ε0, written in Cantor normal form,

 if λ = ωα1 + ... + ωαk−1 + ωαk for α1 ≥ ... ≥ αk−1 ≥ αk, then λ[n] = ωα1 + ... + ωαk−1 + ωαk[n],
 if λ = ωα+1, then λ[n] = ωαn,
 if λ = ωα for a limit ordinal α, then λ[n] = ωα[n],

and

 if λ = ε0, take λ[0] = 0 and λ[n + 1] = ωλ[n] as in [Gallier 1991]; alternatively, take the same sequence except starting with λ[0] = 1 as in [Prӧmel, et al., 1991]. For n > 0, the alternative version has one additional ω in the resulting exponential tower, i.e. λ[n] = ωω⋰ω with n omegas.

Some authors use slightly different definitions (e.g., ωα+1[n] = ωα(n+1), instead of ωαn), and some define this hierarchy only for α < ε0 (thus excluding fε0 from the hierarchy).

To continue beyond ε0, see the Fundamental sequences for the Veblen hierarchy.

Points of interest

Following are some relevant points of interest about fast-growing hierarchies:

 Every fα is a total function.  If the fundamental sequences are computable (e.g., as in the Wainer hierarchy), then every fα is a total computable function.
 In the Wainer hierarchy, fα is dominated by fβ if α < β. (For any two functions f, g: N → N, f is said to dominate g if f(n) > g(n) for all sufficiently large n.)  The same property holds in any fast-growing hierarchy with fundamental sequences satisfying the so-called Bachmann property. (This property holds for most natural well orderings.)
 In the Grzegorczyk hierarchy, every primitive recursive function is dominated by some fα with α < ω.  Hence, in the Wainer hierarchy, every primitive recursive function is dominated by fω, which is a variant of the Ackermann function.
 For n ≥ 3, the set  in the Grzegorczyk hierarchy is composed of just those total multi-argument functions which, for sufficiently large arguments, are computable within time bounded by some fixed iterate fn-1k evaluated at the maximum argument.
 In the Wainer hierarchy, every fα with α < ε0 is computable and provably total in Peano arithmetic.
 Every computable function that is provably total in Peano arithmetic is dominated by some fα with α < ε0 in the Wainer hierarchy.  Hence fε0 in the Wainer hierarchy is not provably total in Peano arithmetic.
 The Goodstein function has approximately the same growth rate (i.e. each is dominated by some fixed iterate of the other) as fε0 in the Wainer hierarchy, dominating every fα for which α < ε0, and hence is not provably total in Peano Arithmetic.
 In the Wainer hierarchy, if α < β < ε0, then fβ dominates every computable function within time and space bounded by some fixed iterate fαk.
 Friedman's TREE function dominates fΓ0 in a fast-growing hierarchy described by Gallier (1991).
 The Wainer hierarchy of functions fα and the Hardy hierarchy of functions hα are related by fα = hωα for all α < ε0.  The Hardy hierarchy "catches up" to the Wainer hierarchy at α = ε0, such that fε0 and hε0 have the same growth rate, in the sense that fε0(n-1) ≤ hε0(n) ≤ fε0(n+1) for all n ≥ 1. (Gallier 1991)
  and Cichon & Wainer (1983) showed that the slow-growing hierarchy of functions gα attains the same growth rate as the function fε0 in the Wainer hierarchy when α is the Bachmann–Howard ordinal. Girard (1981) further showed that the slow-growing hierarchy gα attains the same growth rate  as fα (in a particular fast-growing hierarchy) when α is the ordinal of the theory ID<ω of arbitrary finite iterations of an inductive definition. (Wainer 1989)

Functions in fast-growing hierarchies

The functions at finite levels (α < ω) of any fast-growing hierarchy coincide with those of the Grzegorczyk hierarchy: (using hyperoperation)

 f0(n) = n + 1 = 2[1]n − 1
 f1(n) = f0n(n) = n + n = 2n = 2[2]n
 f2(n) = f1n(n) = 2n · n > 2n = 2[3]n for n ≥ 2
 fk+1(n) = fkn(n) > (2[k + 1])n n ≥ 2[k + 2]n for n ≥ 2, k < ω.

Beyond the finite levels are the functions of the Wainer hierarchy (ω ≤ α ≤ ε0):

 fω(n) = fn(n) > 2[n + 1]n > 2[n](n + 3) − 3 = A(n, n) for n ≥ 4, where A is the Ackermann function (of which fω is a unary version).
 fω+1(n) = fωn(n) ≥ fn[n + 2]n(n) for all n > 0, where n[n + 2]n is the nth Ackermann number.
 fω+1(64) > fω64(5) > Graham's number (= g64 in the sequence defined by g0 = 4, gk+1 = 3[gk + 2]3).  This follows by noting fω(n) > 2[n + 1]n > 3[n]3 + 2, and hence fω(gk + 2) > gk+1 + 2.
 fε0(n) is the first function in the Wainer hierarchy that dominates the Goodstein function.

References
 Buchholz, W.; Wainer, S.S (1987). "Provably Computable Functions and the Fast Growing Hierarchy". Logic and Combinatorics, edited by S. Simpson, Contemporary Mathematics, Vol. 65, AMS, 179-198.

 PDF: . (In particular Section 12, pp. 59–64, "A Glimpse at Hierarchies of Fast and Slow Growing Functions".)

 Löb, M.H.; Wainer, S.S. (1970), "Hierarchies of number theoretic functions", Arch. Math. Logik, 13. Correction, Arch. Math. Logik, 14, 1971. Part I , Part 2 , Corrections .
 Prömel, H. J.; Thumser, W.; Voigt, B. "Fast growing functions based on Ramsey theorems", Discrete Mathematics, v.95 n.1-3, p. 341-358, December 1991  .
 

Computability theory
Proof theory
Hierarchy of functions
Large numbers